The 71st Golden Globe Awards, honoring the best in film and American television of 2013, was broadcast live from the Beverly Hilton Hotel in Beverly Hills, California, on January 12, 2014, by NBC, as part of the 2013-14 film awards season. The ceremony was produced by Dick Clark Productions in association with the Hollywood Foreign Press Association. Woody Allen was announced as the Cecil B. DeMille Award honoree for his lifetime achievements on September 13, 2013, and Diane Keaton accepted the award for him. On October 15, Tina Fey and Amy Poehler were announced as the co-hosts for the second time in a row and as the co-hosts for the 72nd Golden Globe Awards. The nominations were announced on December 12, 2013, by Aziz Ansari, Zoe Saldana and Olivia Wilde. American Hustle, Behind the Candelabra, Breaking Bad, Brooklyn Nine-Nine, and Dallas Buyers Club were among the films and television shows that received multiple awards.

Winners and nominees

These are the nominees for the 71st Golden Globe Awards. Winners are listed at the top of each list.

Film

Films with multiple nominations
The following 16 films received multiple nominations:

Films with multiple wins
The following 2 films received multiple wins:

Television

Series with multiple nominations
The following 16 series received multiple nominations:

Series with multiple wins
The following 3 series won multiple times:

Presenters
The Hollywood Foreign Press Association announced the following presenters:

 Ben Affleck with Best Director – Motion Picture
 Kevin Bacon and Kyra Sedgwick with intro of Miss Golden Globe and Best Actress in a Television Series – Drama
 Drew Barrymore with Best Motion Picture – Musical or Comedy
 Kate Beckinsale, Sean Combs, and Usher with Best Original Score and Best Original Song
 Orlando Bloom and Zoe Saldana with Best Foreign Language Film
 Julie Bowen and Seth Meyers with Best Actor in a Television Series – Comedy or Musical
 Sandra Bullock and Tom Hanks with Best Supporting Actress – Motion Picture
 Jim Carrey introduced American Hustle
 Jessica Chastain with Best Actor in a Motion Picture – Drama
 Emilia Clarke and Chris O'Donnell with Best Actress in a Television Series – Comedy or Musical
 Steve Coogan and Philomena Lee introduced Philomena
 Matt Damon introduced Captain Phillips
 Johnny Depp with Best Motion Picture – Drama
 Laura Dern introduced Nebraska
 Leonardo DiCaprio with Best Actress in a Motion Picture – Drama
 Robert Downey Jr. with Best Actress in a Motion Picture – Musical or Comedy
 Aaron Eckhart and Paula Patton with Best Actor in a Television Series – Drama and Best Television Series – Drama
 Chris Evans and Uma Thurman with Best Television Series – Comedy or Musical
 Jimmy Fallon and Melissa McCarthy with Best Actor – Miniseries or Television Film
 Colin Farrell introduced Inside Llewyn Davis
 Amber Heard, Taylor Kinney, and Jesse Spencer with Best Supporting Actor – Series, Miniseries or Television Film
 Chris Hemsworth and Niki Lauda introduced Rush
 Jonah Hill and Margot Robbie introduced The Wolf of Wall Street
 Mila Kunis and Channing Tatum with Best Supporting Actress – Series, Miniseries or Television Film
 Jennifer Lawrence with Best Actor in a Motion Picture – Musical or Comedy
 Liam Neeson introduced Gravity
 Chris Pine and Emma Watson with Best Animated Feature Film
 Mark Ruffalo and Naomi Watts with Best Miniseries or Television Film and Best Actress – Miniseries or Television Film
 Emma Stone with Cecil B. DeMille Award (accepted by Diane Keaton)
 Emma Thompson with Best Screenplay
 Christoph Waltz with Best Supporting Actor – Motion Picture
 Olivia Wilde introduced Her
 Reese Witherspoon introduced 12 Years a Slave

See also
 Hollywood Foreign Press Association
 86th Academy Awards
 66th Primetime Emmy Awards
 65th Primetime Emmy Awards
 20th Screen Actors Guild Awards
 67th British Academy Film Awards
 3rd AACTA International Awards
 34th Golden Raspberry Awards
 68th Tony Awards
 2013 in film
 2013 in American television

References

External links
 
 
 

071
2013 film awards
2013 television awards
2013 in American television
Golden Globes
Golden Globe
January 2014 events in the United States